Tuscaloosa is a city in and the seat of Tuscaloosa County in west-central Alabama, United States, on the Black Warrior River where the Gulf Coastal and Piedmont plains meet. Alabama's fifth-largest city, it had an estimated population of 101,129 in 2019. It was known as Tuskaloosa until the early 20th century. It is also known as "the Druid City" because of the numerous water oaks planted in its downtown streets since the 1840s.

Incorporated on December 13, 1819, it was named after Tuskaloosa, the chief of a band of Muskogean-speaking people defeated by the forces of Spanish explorer Hernando de Soto in 1540 in the Battle of Mabila, in what is now central Alabama. It served as Alabama's capital city from 1826 to 1846.

Tuscaloosa is the regional center of industry, commerce, healthcare and education for the area of west-central Alabama known as West Alabama; and the principal city of the Tuscaloosa Metropolitan Statistical Area, which includes Tuscaloosa, Hale and Pickens counties.

It is the home of the University of Alabama, Stillman College and Shelton State Community College. While it attracted international attention when Mercedes-Benz announced on September 30, 1993 that it would build its first North American automotive assembly plant in Tuscaloosa County, the University of Alabama remains the city's dominant economic and cultural engine, making it a college town. City leaders adopted the moniker "The City of Champions" after the Alabama Crimson Tide football team won the College Football National Championship in their 2009, 2011, 2012, 2015, 2017 and 2020  seasons.

In 2008, Tuscaloosa hosted the USA Olympic Triathlon trials for the Beijing Games. Through the 2000s and 2010s, it has been declared the "Most Livable City in America", one of America's "100 Best Communities for Young People", one of the "50 Best College Towns", and one of the "Best Places to Launch a Small Business".

History

Native American
In 1828, Andrew Jackson was elected president of the United States. He had gained popularity when he defeated the Creek at the Battle of Horseshoe Bend in 1814, following victories in the War of 1812. He long proposed Indian removal to an Indian Territory to be established west of the Mississippi, to make land available in the Southeast for European-American settlement. Jackson abandoned the policy of his predecessors of treating different Indian groups as separate nations. Instead, he aggressively pursued plans to move all Indian tribes living east of the Mississippi River.

Following Congressional passage of the Indian Removal Act, in 1832 the Creek National Council signed the Treaty of Cusseta, ceding their remaining lands east of the Mississippi to the U.S., and accepting relocation to the Indian Territory. They had already been under pressure from new settlers encroaching on their territory. Most Muscogee-speaking peoples were removed to Indian Territory during the Trail of Tears in 1834, although some remained behind. Some Muscogee in Alabama live near Poarch Creek Reservation in Atmore (northeast of Mobile).

Statehood and origin of name

The pace of white settlement in the Southeast increased greatly after the War of 1812 and the Treaty of Fort Jackson and the subsequent availability of land previously settled by Native Americans. A small assortment of log cabins soon arose near the large Creek village at the fall line of the river, which the new settlers named in honor of the sixteenth-century Chief Tuskaloosa of a Muskogean-speaking tribecombining the Choctaw words "tushka" or "tashka" ("warrior") and "lusa" ("black").

In 1817, Alabama became a territory. On December 13, 1819, the territorial legislature incorporated the town of Tuskaloosa, one day before Congress admitted Alabama to the Union as a state.

From 1826 to 1846, Tuskaloosa was the capital of Alabama. The State House was built at the corner of 6th Street and 28th Avenue (now the site of Capitol Park). In 1831, the University of Alabama was established and the town's population and economy grew rapidly, but the relocation of the capital to Montgomery caused a severe decline. The state legislature established Alabama State Hospital for the Insane (now Bryce Hospital) in Tuskaloosa in the 1850s, which helped restore the city's fortunes.

Civil War
During the Civil War following Alabama's secession from the Union, several thousand men from Tuscaloosa fought in the Confederate armies. During the last weeks of the War, the campus of the university was burned in a battle. The larger town was also damaged in the battle, and its White population suffered economically. Its Black population was emancipated from slavery.

In the 1890s the construction of a system of locks and dams on the Black Warrior River by the U.S. Army Corps of Engineers improved navigation to such an extent that Tuscaloosa was effectively connected to the Gulf Coast seaport of Mobile. This stimulated the economy and trade, and mining and metallurgical industries were developed in the region. By the onset of the 20th century, the growth of the University of Alabama and the mental health-care facilities in the city, along with a strong national economy, fueled a steady growth in Tuscaloosa which continued unabated for 100 years.

Civil rights movement

In the post World War II era, African Americans increased their activism to regain their constitutional civil rights, and challenged southern segregation in numerous ways. In 1952, Autherine Lucy was admitted to the university as a graduate student, but her admission was rescinded when authorities discovered she was not white. After three years of legal wrangling, Thurgood Marshall and the NAACP got a court order preventing the university from banning Lucy and another student based on race. The following year, Lucy enrolled as a graduate student in Library Science on February 3, 1956, becoming the first African American admitted to a white public school or university in the state.  During her first day of class on February 6, students and others rioted on the campus, where a mob of more than a thousand white men pelted the car in which she was taken to her classes. Death threats were made against her and the university president's home was stoned.  The riots were the most violent involving a pro-segregation demonstration since the landmark Brown v. Board of Education Supreme Court decision. After the riots, the university suspended Lucy from school stating her own safety was a concern; it later expelled her on a technicality. She was active in civil rights for a time, but withdrew later that year. After her expulsion was annulled by the university in 1988, Lucy re-enrolled and completed her M.S. in education and graduated together with her daughter in 1992.

On June 11, 1963, George Wallace, governor of Alabama, stood in front of the Foster Auditorium entrance at The University of Alabama in what became known as the Stand in the Schoolhouse Door in an attempt to stop desegregation of that institution by the enrollment of two African-American students, Vivian Malone and James Hood. He had created a challenge to federal orders, when confronted by US Deputy Attorney General Nicholas Katzenbach and federal marshals sent in by Attorney General Robert F. Kennedy, Wallace stepped aside. President John F. Kennedy had supported integration of the University of Alabama as well.

On June 9, 1964, in an event that later became known as Bloody Tuesday, a group of peaceful African-American Civil rights marchers were beaten, arrested and tear gassed by police in Tuscaloosa while walking from the First African Baptist Church to the County Courthouse to protest against the segregated restrooms and drinking fountains of this public facility.  Thirty-three people were sent to the hospital for treatment of injuries, and 94 were arrested. The events were not witnessed by outside journalists and had little influence outside the local community. A year later, the Bloody Sunday events in Selma of a voting rights march attracted national and international coverage and attention.

James Hood dropped out of the University of Alabama after two months. He later returned and, in 1997, received his Ph.D. in interdisciplinary studies. Malone persisted in her studies at the time and became the first African American to graduate from the university. In 2000, the university granted her an honorary doctorate of humane letters. Later in his life, Wallace apologized for his opposition at that time to racial integration.

In 2010, the university formally honored Lucy, Hood and Malone by renaming the plaza in front of Foster Auditorium as Malone-Hood Plaza and erecting the Autherine Lucy Clock Tower in the plaza.

2011 tornado
 
Most of the deaths, 44, were in Tuscaloosa alone, with the rest being in Birmingham and surrounding suburbs. Officials at DCH Regional Medical alone reported treating more than 1,000 injured people in the tornado aftermath. Officials reported dozens of unaccompanied minors being admitted for treatment at the hospital, raising questions about the possible loss of their parents. Several were taken to pediatric trauma wards, indicating serious injuries. Referring to the extent and severity of the damage, Mayor Walter Maddox stated that "we have neighborhoods that have been basically removed from the map." The same tornado later went on to cause major damage in the Birmingham area. In all, the cost of damage from the tornado amounted to $2.45 billion, making it, at the time, the costliest tornado in U.S. history, though it would be surpassed less than a month later by the devastating Joplin, Missouri tornado of May 22.

The tornado was part of the 2011 Super Outbreak which affected large parts of the eastern United States and was the largest tornado outbreak ever recorded. In total, 324 people were killed by tornadoes during the outbreak, including 238 in Alabama alone. The tornadoes and other severe weather combined for over $10 billion in damage throughout the affected states, with more than 20% of the damage cost resulting from the tornado that struck Tuscaloosa.

In the immediate aftermath of the tornado, thousands of rescue workers dug through the wreckage looking for survivors and recovering bodies. More than 450 persons were originally listed as missing in the post-disaster chaos, leading to fears that the death toll could climb rapidly and skepticism about the relatively low fatality figures in relation to the high number of casualties. Rumors abounded that refrigerated trucks were being brought to store unidentified remains, and that countless bodies were beneath area waters. But the fatality figure did not increase (and was later reduced). Most persons listed as missing were later found to have survived. During this period, The Tuscaloosa News posted an on-line people finder to aid people to find each other, as well as determine who was still missing.

Two days after the storm, US president Barack Obama and Alabama governor Robert Bentley, and their spouses, Michelle Obama and Diane Bentley, respectively, accompanied Mayor Maddox on a tour of the damage and the recovery efforts, along with FEMA Administrator Craig Fugate and several Congressional dignitaries. Remarking about the scale and severity of the damage, Obama said, "I've never seen devastation like this, it's heartbreaking", after touring the damaged areas.  Obama pledged the full resources of the federal government toward aiding the recovery efforts. Bentley—himself a Tuscaloosa native—pledged additional national guard troops.

Tuscaloosa Mayor Walt Maddox announced that he was requesting 500 additional National Guard troops and calling for more volunteer aid workers and cadaver teams for the recovery of bodies, in order to prevent the spread of disease.

The New York Yankees organization contributed $500,000 to the American Red Cross and Salvation Army to aid in recovery efforts, and the Atlanta Braves organization donated $100,000. Actor Charlie Sheen visited the city to pay his respects on May 2 and donated supplies for relief efforts, along with several other actors, musicians and athletes.

Due to the disaster, on August 6, 2011, the University of Alabama held a delayed graduation ceremony for the class of 2011. It awarded posthumous degrees to six students who died in the tornado. The cable channel ESPN filmed a tribute in memory of the devastation.

Bicentennial
The city of Tuscaloosa celebrated its 200th birthday on December 13, 2019 with city officials holding various dedications and commemorative events throughout the city, including the displaying of a "bicentennial quilt" and a fireworks display following the 44th Annual West Alabama Christmas Parade, which was dedicated to the city's birthday. The University of Alabama gifted two sculptures to the city, one of a 30 foot-tall, 9,500-pound statue of the Roman goddess Minerva—designed by local artist Caleb O'Connor—at Manderson Landing park along the Black Warrior River, and a sculpture known as The Walkway. According to the Tuscaloosa200.com website, the Walkway is a "replica of the route of the Black Warrior River from Demopolis to Tuscaloosa, it traces milestones in our city's existence and survival, but its twists and turns, ebbs and flows have mirrored our city's past." It was created by sculptor and architect Craig R. Wedderspoon.

A hermetically-sealed time capsule was buried under a large boulder near the boat house near Manderson Landing; the time capsule is intended to capture "What was life like in Tuscaloosa during the year 2019?" and is set to be opened on December 13, 2069, the city's 250th birthday.

Geography

Most water within the city limits is in Lake Tuscaloosa, which is entirely in the city limits, and the Black Warrior River.

It lies on the fall line of the Black Warrior River, approximately  upriver from the river's confluence with the Tombigbee River at Demopolis. Because of its location on the boundary between the Appalachian Highland and the Gulf Coastal Plain, the geography of the area around Tuscaloosa is diverse, varying from heavily forested hills to the northeast to a low-lying, marshy plain to the southwest.

Cityscape
Major areas of Tuscaloosa city proper include:

West Tuscaloosa
Central/Midtown Tuscaloosa
Downtown Tuscaloosa
The University of Alabama main campus
Alberta City
North River
Hillcrest

Climate

Typical of the Deep South, Tuscaloosa experiences a humid subtropical climate (Köppen Cfa). The Gulf of Mexico heavily influences the climate by supplying the region with warm, moist air. During the fall, winter, and spring seasons, the interaction of this warm, moist air with cooler, drier air from the North along fronts creates precipitation. These fronts usually move from west to east as they track along the jet stream. Notable exceptions occur during hurricane season, where storms may move from due south to due north or even from east to west during land-falling hurricanes. The interaction between low- and high-pressure air masses is most pronounced during the severe weather seasons in the spring and fall. During the summer, the jet stream flows well to the north of the southeastern U.S., and most precipitation is consequently convectional, i.e., caused by the warm surface heating the air above.

Severe thunderstorms can bring damaging winds, large hail, and occasionally tornadoes. An F4 tornado struck Tuscaloosa County in December 2000, killing eleven people. Tuscaloosa was struck by an F2 tornado in January 1997, which resulted in the death of one person. In April 2011, two tornadoes in a span of twelve days hit the city, the first being an EF3 on April 15, and the second and more devastating being an EF4 on April 27, when more than 50 deaths resulted. The city suffered considerable infrastructure damage.

On average, the low temperature falls to the freezing mark or below on 46 days a year, and to or below  on 4.4 days. Spring usually lasts from late-February to mid-May, becoming drier as the season progresses. There are 71–72 days of + highs annually and 3.5 days of + highs. The latter part of summer tends to be drier. Autumn, which spans from mid-September to early December, tends to be similar to spring in terms of temperature and precipitation.

Demographics

As of the census of 2000 there were 77,906 people, 31,381 households, and 16,945 families residing in the city. The racial makeup of the city was 54.09% White, 42.73% Black or African American, 0.16% Native American, 1.49% Asian, 0.02% Pacific Islander, 0.63% from other races, and 0.87% from two or more races. 1.40% of the population were Hispanic or Latino of any race.

There were 31,381 households, out of which 23.9% had children under the age of 18 living with them, 35.0% were married couples living together, 15.7% had a female householder with no husband present, and 46.0% were non-families. 35.2% of all households were made up of individuals, and 9.3% had someone living alone who was 65 years of age or older. The average household size was 2.22 and the average family size was 2.93.

In the city, 19.8% of the population was under the age of 18, 24.5% was from 18 to 24, 25.4% from 25 to 44, 18.5% from 45 to 64, and 11.8% was 65 years of age or older. The median age was 28 years. For every 100 females, there were 90.8 males. For every 100 females age 18 and over, there were 87.9 males.

The median income for a household in the city was $27,731, and the median income for a family was $41,753. Males had a median income of $31,614 versus $24,507 for females. The per capita income for the city was $19,129. About 14.2% of families and 23.6% of the population were below the poverty line, including 25.3% of those under age 18 and 13.4% of those age 65 or over.

2020 census

As of the 2020 United States Census, there were 99,600 people, 36,779 households, and 20,176 families residing in the city.

2010 census
As of the census of 2010 there were 90,468 people, 36,185 households, and 17,592 families residing in the city. The racial makeup of the city was 53.8% White, 41.5% Black or African American, 0.2% Native American, 1.8% Asian, 0.0% Pacific Islander, 1.5% from other races, and 1.1% from two or more races. 3.0% of the population were Hispanic or Latino of any race.

There were 36,185 households, out of which 20.5% had children under the age of 18 living with them, 28.5% were married couples living together, 16.2% had a female householder with no husband present, and 51.4% were non-families. 35.4% of all households were made up of individuals, and 7.8% had someone living alone who was 65 years of age or older. The average household size was 2.23 and the average family size was 2.95.

In the city, the population was spread out, with 17.4% under the age of 18, 31.9% from 18 to 24, 22.0% from 25 to 44, 19.0% from 45 to 64, and 9.8% who were 65 years of age or older. The median age was 25.4 years. For every 100 females, there were 92.7 males. For every 100 females age 18 and over, there were 94.6 males.

The median income for a household in the city was $31,874, and the median income for a family was $49,588. Males had a median income of $36,231 versus $30,552 for females. The per capita income for the city was $21,042. About 17.0% of families and 29.8% of the population were below the poverty line, including 32.5% of those under age 18 and 12.4% of those age 65 or over.

Religion
The city of Tuscaloosa is home to many places of worship in which people from the surrounding area of West Alabama may come to worship; the predominant denomination is Southern Baptist. Holy Spirit Roman Catholic Church is one of three Catholic churches. First Presbyterian Church is the place of worship for many American and German residents in Tuscaloosa. There are also Presbyterian Church in America congregations in the city. First Baptist Church, Calvary Baptist Church, Alberta Baptist Church, Emmanuel Baptist Church, and First African Baptist Church are five of the many Baptist churches in Tuscaloosa. Holy Cross Lutheran Church is a church reflecting on the Evangelical Lutheran community of Tuscaloosa. There is the Unitarian Universalist Congregation of Tuscaloosa. The University Church of Christ has both a campus ministry and a prison ministry. St. Gregory the Theologian Eastern Orthodox Church is the only Orthodox church in West Alabama. Its congregation is made up of Russians, Greeks, Romanians, Arabs, Eastern Europeans, and converts to Eastern Christianity. Some of the oldest churches in Tuscaloosa are St. John's Roman Catholic Church (founded c. 1845), Christ Episcopal Church (c. 1828), and First Baptist Church (c. 1818). Tuscaloosa is also home to many non-Christians as well. The Jewish community of Tuscaloosa worships at the Chabad of Tuscaloosa as well as Temple Emanu-El and the Hillel B'nai B'rith Center, both located on the University of Alabama campus. The Hindu Mandir Temple and Cultural Center is also found in Tuscaloosa. Muslims comprise a small percentage and worship at the Mosque. An Islamic center is located near the university campus. There is also a Kingdom Hall of Jehovah's Witnesses.

Economy

Although higher education is the bedrock of Tuscaloosa's economy,  it has diverse sectors of manufacturing and service. 25% of the labor force in the Tuscaloosa Metropolitan Statistical Area is employed by the federal, state and local governments; 16.7% in manufacturing; 16.4% in retail trade and transportation; 11.6% in finance, information, and private enterprise; 10.3% in mining and construction; and 9.2% in hospitality. Education and healthcare account for 7.2% of the area's workforce, with the remainder employed in other services.

The city's industrial and manufacturing base includes BFGoodrich Tire Manufacturing, GAF Materials Corporation, Hunt Refining Company, JVC America, Nucor Steel and Phifer Wire.

It opened in 1995 and began assembling the R-Class Grand Sport Tourer in 2005. From 2006–2015 it produced the GL-Class vehicles; and since 1998 and 2015 respectively, has produced the GLS-Class and GLE-CLASS. Plants that supply components to Mercedes-Benz are also in the area.

The Westervelt Company, a land resources and wildlife management company, has its headquarters in Tuscaloosa. Originally the Gulf State Paper Corporation, founded in 1927, it sold its pulp and paperboard operations to the Rock-Tenn Company of Norcross, Georgia in 2005 and was restructured to form Westervelt.

Healthcare and education are cornerstones of Tuscaloosa's service sector, which includes the University of Alabama, DCH Regional Medical Center, Bryce Hospital, the William D. Partlow Developmental Center, and the Tuscaloosa VA Medical Center.

Arts and culture

Libraries and museums

The Tuscaloosa Public Library is a joint city-county agency with nearly 200,000 items and approximately 47,000 registered patrons (28% of the county's population). There are currently three branches: the Main branch, on Jack Warner Parkway; the Weaver-Bolden branch, in western Tuscaloosa; and the Brown branch in suburban Taylorville.

The University of Alabama, Stillman College and Shelton State Community College also have libraries open to the public for non-circulation use.

Museums in Tuscaloosa are located all over town, but are primarily concentrated in the downtown area or on the campus of UA. Museums that are downtown include CHOM: the Children's Hands-On Museum of Tuscaloosa and the Murphy African-American Museum. The Alabama Museum of Natural History and the Paul W. Bryant Museum are located on the UA campus. Additional museums and galleries are found across the river in Northport.

Performing arts

Tuscaloosa is home to several performing arts organizations. Though some are affiliated with UA or Shelton State, several are independent organizations, including the Tuscaloosa Community Theater and Shakespeare troupe The Rude Mechanicals. These various organizations cooperate and coordinate their operations through the Arts and Humanities Council of Tuscaloosa County.  The Arts Council also operates the Bama Theatre.

The Bama Theatre is a 1,094-seat proscenium theatre located in downtown Tuscaloosa and is operated by The Arts and Humanities Council. The Bama Theatre was built between 1937 and 1938 under the New Deal-era Public Works Administration as a movie palace. At the time of its construction in 1938, it was the only air-conditioned building in Tuscaloosa. The theatre was renovated as a performing arts center in 1976 and housed the Tuscaloosa Symphony Orchestra and Theatre Tuscaloosa troupe until those groups moved into their own facilities.

Today, the Bama Theatre is the residence of the Tuscaloosa Children's Theatre Company and the Tuscaloosa Community Dancers.  Additionally, it hosts the Arts Council's Bama Art House movie series.  The Bama Theatre hosts a Jewish Film Festival in the spring, as well as several traveling film festivals. Additionally, the Bama Theatre has recently been serving as a concert venue, hosting recent performances by Joan Baez, Aimee Mann, the Drive-By Truckers, Umphrey's Mcgee, Ryan Adams, Chuck Leavell and many other performing artists.

The Frank Moody Music Building on the UA campus holds a 1000-seat Concert Hall and a 140-seat Recital Hall. The Concert Hall features a three-story-tall, 5,000-pipe Holtkamp organ and frequently hosts concerts and other musical events. The Recital Hall features a Schlicker organ that was crafted in Buffalo, New York. 
The Tuscaloosa Symphony Orchestra, in its 35th year, is based at the Moody Music Building and is conducted by Adam Flatt.

Also on the UA campus, Rowand-Johnson Hall holds the Marian Gallaway Theatre, a 305-seat proscenium theater, the Allen Bales 170-seat thrust theatre, and the 600-seat Morgan Auditorium. These facilities primarily host university-sponsored performing arts shows, such as Dance Alabama and the university's theater productions.

The Sandra Hall-Ray Fine Arts Centre on the Shelton State campus holds the Bean-Brown Theatre, a 450-seat proscenium theater, and the 100-seat Alabama Power Foundation Recital Hall.

Tuscaloosa is also home to the Alabama Choir School.

Coleman Coliseum is a 15,383-seat multipurpose arena that serves as the city of Tuscaloosa's municipal civic center. Because the City of Tuscaloosa does not have a civic center, the demand for events grew rapidly and the Coliseum doubled its capacity in the 1970s. In the 1990s, marquee concerts and events that the arena had seen in the previous two decades grew scarce as the facility became more outdated and mostly devoted to Crimson Tide athletic events. In the hope that the university could pull more events at the facility, the Coliseum underwent a significant renovation in 2005, costing over $24 million.
The coliseum has hosted a diversity of events including commencement exercises, a visit by President Ronald Reagan, alumni gatherings, student convocations, concerts, operas, ballets, appearances by political figures, WCW Saturday Night, etc. Travis Tritt filmed his "Bible Belt" country music video there. Some of the stars who have performed on its stages include The Rolling Stones, Elvis Presley, Elton John, Grateful Dead, Tom Petty, Led Zeppelin, Ray Charles, Jimi Hendrix, Bob Dylan, Alan Jackson, Reba McEntire, Jay Leno, Hank Williams, Jr., Daughtry, and B.o.B.

In December 2010, construction on the Tuscaloosa Amphitheater officially wrapped up with the dedication ceremony taking place days after. The 7,470 capacity Tuscaloosa Amphitheater is blocks away from the downtown district and sits at the end of the Riverwalk on the banks of the Black Warrior River. Since its dedication ceremony in March 2011, a variety of performers have played there including John Legend, The Lumineers, Flo Rida, Nelly, TLC, ZZ Top, ODESZA, Mary J. Blige, Kenny Chesney, Widespread Panic, Steely Dan, Jeff Dunham, Jill Scott, and Fun. The Amphitheater has also held events such as the Blues and Brews Music Festival and a pro boxing match.

Festivals and events
Prior to each football game is a massive gathering at the UA Quad, where people gather starting on Friday for tailgating and the University of Alabama holds pep rallies on the Gorgas library steps. The Quad has hosted ESPN's College Gameday several times and also is a place to meet Alabama football legends on game day and perform the "Elephant Stomp" (a pre-game parade) to Bryant–Denny Stadium with the Alabama mascot "Big Al" and the Million Dollar Band.

On the first Thursday of each month, the Tuscaloosa art galleries open their doors for "Art and Soul"—highlighting local artists. There is a shuttle service that runs between this event and Northport's "Art Night".

The City of Tuscaloosa holds parades annually for holidays such as New Year's Day, Martin Luther King Jr. Day, St. Patrick's Day, Memorial Day, Independence Day, Labor Day, Veterans Day, and Christmas Day. Holy Spirit Roman Catholic Church also hosts an annual religious procession/parade for Our Lady of Guadalupe on the Virgin of Guadalupe feast day in December, which reflects on both the catholic and Hispanic community.

Other annual city festivals worth noting are:

Weindorf Festival – The Weindorf Festival is a cultural German festival in which native Tuscaloosans and German immigrants celebrate Tuscaloosa's bond with Germany through the nearby Mercedes-Benz Automobile Plant and Tuscaloosa's sister City of Schorndorf. The celebration includes German alcoholic beverages, singing, dancing, and other Germanic arts.
Sakura Festival – The Sakura festival celebrates the symbolic moment when a cherry blossom petal detaches itself to float earthward, which reminds one of the paradoxically fleeting, yet enduring, nature of life. Every March Tuscaloosa celebrates its ties with Japan and its Sister City of Narashino City. This festival features a Haiku Contest.
Kentuck Festival of Arts – This annual event takes place during the third week in October near the banks of the Black Warrior River in Historic Downtown Northport. This nationally recognized event brings in visitors and artists from all over the United States. As several hundred talented artists bring their creations, several thousand visitors come to pay tribute to their skills. Those crowds come not only for the art, but also for the artistry of the days of old. Several artisans provide live demonstrations of blacksmithing, furniture making, quilting, and potting. There are music acts performing on stages and many varied foods available.
Moundville Native American Festival – This annual festival takes place at the Moundville Archaeological Park. Native American performing artists, craftspeople, and musicians entertain and educate visitors about the rich culture and heritage that makes Southeastern Indians unique. Visitors can look forward to learning about the society and culture that existed there 800 years ago.
Dickens Downtown – An annual Victorian holiday celebration known as Dickens Downtown takes place on the first Tuesday night in December in Downtown Northport. Dickens is a community supported gathering to celebrate the true spirit of Christmas involving Theatre Tuscaloosa performing scenes from "A Christmas Carol", local choirs, the 5th Alabama Regimental Band, a real English Town Crier, father Christmas, and business and neighborhood open houses. As the area comes alive with characters and props straight from 'A Christmas Carol', local shops offer hot cocoa and cookies.
Druid City Arts Festival - Since 2010, the DCAF has been held at Government Plaza downtown in the first week of April every year. The annual open-air festival is free for anyone to attend and hosts vendors from around the state of Alabama and the country that display art, amateur and professional alike, that is available for purchase in tents scattered throughout the plaza. Attendees can travel from tent to tent admiring and buying available pieces, food, and other trinkets from vendors. There's a dedicated Kids Zone where sidewalk chalking takes place, and there's usually free musical performances held under the pavilion in the center of the plaza. The festival celebrated its 10th anniversary on April 5 and 6, 2019; it was also the festival's first two-day event, which is usually held for just one day a year.

Points of interest
Notable points of interest in the city of Tuscaloosa include:

 Alabama Museum of Natural History
 Alabama Stage and Screen Hall of Fame
 Bama Theatre
 Battle-Friedman House
 Bryant–Denny Stadium
 Bryce Hospital
 Christ Episcopal Church
 Denny Chimes
 Downtown Tuscaloosa Historic District
 Dr. John R. Drish House
 Dreamland Bar-B-Que
 Gorgas House
 Hugh R. Thomas Bridge
 Jemison-Van de Graaff Mansion
 Moundville Archaeological Park
 Ol' Colony Golf Complex
 Paul Bryant Bridge
 Paul W. Bryant Museum
 Queen City Pool and Pool House
 Tuscaloosa Amphitheater
 University of Alabama Arboretum
 Westervelt Warner Museum of American Art
 Woolsey Finnell Bridge

Sports

Tuscaloosa is known for its collegiate athletics—particularly the University of Alabama Crimson Tide football team. The University of Alabama also currently fields championship-caliber teams in baseball, golf, women's gymnastics, and softball. These teams play in athletics facilities on the university campus, including Bryant–Denny Stadium (capacity of 102,000+), Coleman Coliseum (formerly Memorial Coliseum), Sewell-Thomas Stadium, Rhoads Stadium, Foster Auditorium and the Ol' Colony Golf Complex.

Stillman College fields teams in football, men's and women's basketball, baseball and softball, among other sports, although the school discontinued the football program after completing the 2015 season. In the past decade, Stillman has gone through a series of renovations, including a new football stadium, Stillman Stadium.

Previous professional teams calling Tuscaloosa home included the World Basketball Association's Druid City Dragons in 2006, and Tuscaloosa Warriors football team in 1963, with both folding after one season.

In 2008, Tuscaloosa hosted the USA Olympic Triathlon trials for the Beijing Games.

World renowned putter company, T.P. Mills Co. was founded and is located in Tuscaloosa.

Parks and recreation

The Tuscaloosa County Parks and Recreation Authority, known by the acronym PARA, is a county agency that receives a large amount of its funding from the city, and operates several parks and activity centers within the city. PARA is known for its participation in work therapy programs with the local VA. Additional public recreational sites are owned and maintained by the University of Alabama and federal agencies such as Corps of Engineers.

The arboretum's primary emphasis is on Alabama's native flora and fauna. It includes  of walking trails through native piney woods and oak-hickory climax forest, a wildflower garden containing more than 250 species, ornamental plants, an experimental garden, a bog garden, an open-air pavilion, and a children's garden. Two greenhouses contain collections of orchids, cacti, and tropical plants.

Capitol Park, Tuscaloosa at 6th Street and 28th Avenue is home to the ruins of the former state capitol building or State House from 1826 to 1845. It was later used by the Alabama Central Female College and burned down in 1923.

Other parks in Tuscaloosa include: Veterans Memorial Park, Tuscaloosa River Walk, the Park at Manderson Landing, J. Oviatt Bowers Park, Snow Hinton Park, Monnish Park, Annette N. Shelby Park, Kaulton Park, Palmore Park, and many others.

Government

Tuscaloosa has a strong-mayor variant mayor-council form of government, led by a mayor and a seven-member city council. The mayor and council members are elected concurrently for four-year terms. The mayor is elected by the city at-large while council members are elected to single-member districts. Neither the mayor nor the members of the city council is term-limited. All elected offices are nonpartisan. Elections take place in years following presidential election years, with run-off elections taking place six weeks later if necessary. Terms begin immediately after election. The most recent municipal elections were held in 2021.

The mayor is the chief executive and administrative officer of the city. His main duty is to oversee the day-to-day operation of city departments pursuant to executing policy enacted by the city council or, in the absence of any council policy, his own discretion. His other duties include preparing an operating budget each year for approval by the city council and acting as ambassador of the city. The mayor also presides over city council meetings but votes only in case of ties. The current Mayor of Tuscaloosa is Walter Maddox, who was elected to office in September 2005. Prior to Maddox, Alvin A. DuPont had served as mayor for 24 years.

Previous Members of City Council: District 1 - Bobby E. Howard (2005), Burrell Odom (2013); District 2 - Harrison Taylor (1993); District 3 - the same; District 4 - Lee Garrison (1997), Matt Calderone (2013); District 5 - the same; District 6 - Bob Lundell (2005); District 7 - William Tinker, III (2005).

 William R. Bolling, 1828
 John Owen, 1828
 Wm. R. Smith, 1837
 Robt. S. Inge, 1837
 D. Henry Robinson, 1842
 Robert Blair, 1844–1848, 1859–1861, 1872
 James L. Childress, 1849
 Joseph C. Guild, 1850–1854
 David Woodruff, 1855
 L. S. Skinner, 1856–1858
 Robert Lacey, 1862
 Jesse E. Adams, 1863
 Obediah Berry, 1864–1865, 1873, 1877–1878
 Joseph C. Guild, 1866
 S. B. Smith, 1867
 John S. Garvin, 1867
 Josiah J. Pegues, 1868
 T. F. Samuel, 1869–1871
 John J. Harris, 1874–1876
 William C. Jemison, 1879–1886
 ?
 John C. Pearson, circa 1931
 ?
 Luther Davis, circa 1937
 ?
 J. S. Robertson, circa 1952
 J. Hal McCall, 1953–1956
 George Van Tassel, 1956–1969
 C. Snow Hinton, Jr., 1969–1976
 Ernest W. "Rainy" Collins, 1976–1981
 Alvin P. DuPont, 1981–2005
 Walter Maddox, September 2005–present

The city council acts as the legislative body of the city. It is powered by state law to consider policy and enact law and to make appointments to city boards. The council also considers the budget proposed by the mayor for approval. The majority of work in the council is done by committee. These committees usually consist of three council members, one of whom will be chairman, and relevant non-voting city employees.

Tuscaloosa, as the largest county seat in western Alabama, serves a hub of state and federal government agencies. In addition to the customary offices associated with the county courthouse, namely two District Court Judges, six Circuit Court Judges, the District Attorney and the Public Defender, several Alabama state government agencies have regional offices in Tuscaloosa, such as the Alabama Department of Transportation and the Alabama State Troopers (the state police).

Tuscaloosa is in the federal jurisdiction of the United States District Court for the Northern District of Alabama. There is a courthouse in Tuscaloosa simply called the Federal Courthouse. Several federal agencies operate bureaus out of the courthouse.

Federally, Tuscaloosa is split between the 4th and 7th Congressional Districts, which are represented by Robert Aderholt (R) and Terri Sewell (D), respectively. In addition, Alabama's senior senator, Richard Shelby (R), is a resident of Tuscaloosa.

On the state level, the city is split among the 5th, 21st, and 24th Senate districts and 62nd, 63rd, and 70th House districts in the Alabama State Legislature.

In December 2009, construction on the new federal courthouse of Tuscaloosa began. The $67 million building was the centerpiece of a major downtown urban renewal project. It houses the U.S. District Court, U.S. Bankruptcy Court and Social Security Administration office.

The Northern District of Alabama has only one facility suitable for holding a major criminal trial in Huntsville. However, Huntsville lacks the facilities for safely moving criminal suspects in and out of the building safely. Tuscaloosa's new federal courthouse will anchor the federal structure for the whole Northern District of Alabama.

Education

Higher education

The University of Alabama is the largest university in the state of Alabama in terms of enrollment. Enrolling approximately 40,000 students on a  campus, UA has been a part of Tuscaloosa's identity since it opened its doors in 1831. Stillman College, which opened in 1875, is a historically black liberal arts college enrolling approximately 1,200 students on a  campus. Additionally, Shelton State Community College, one of the largest community colleges in Alabama, is located in the city. The school enrolls around 4,000 students from all backgrounds and income levels.

Primary and secondary education
The Tuscaloosa City School System serves the city. It is overseen by the Tuscaloosa City Board of Education, which is composed of eight members elected by district and a chairman elected by a citywide vote. The Board appoints a Superintendent to manage the day-to-day operations of the system. Operating with a $100 million budget, the system enrolls approximately 10,300 students. The system consists of 24 schools: 13 elementary schools (12 zoned and 1 magnet), 6 middle schools (5 zoned and 1 magnet), 3 high schools (Paul W. Bryant High School, Central High School and Northridge High School), and 2 specialty schools (the Tuscaloosa Center for Technology, a vocational school, and Oak Hill School for special needs students). In 2002, the system spent $6,313 per pupil, the 19th highest amount of the 120 school systems in the state.

The Tuscaloosa County School System serves the county excluding the city. It is overseen by the Tuscaloosa County Board of Education, which is composed of seven elected members. The Board appoints a Superintendent to lead the school system. The system enrolls approximately 18,000 students which are served utilizing a budget of approximately $180 million. The school system consists of 34 schools—6 high schools, 8 middle schools and 19 elementary schools. It also provides services for special needs students at Sprayberry Education Center. In 2013 the school system hired its first minority superintendent of Hispanic/Latin origin who is also only the second female.

Tuscaloosa is also served by several private schools, both secular and religious, including Tuscaloosa Academy, American Christian Academy, Holy Spirit Catholic School, North River Christian Academy, the Capitol School, and Tuscaloosa Christian School (in neighboring Cottondale).

From 1923 to 2011, the state-run William D. Partlow Developmental Center has served the intellectually disabled, offering these citizens a public education as well as seeing to their other needs.

Weekend education
Previously the Tuscaloosa Saturday School, a weekend Japanese educational program, provided Japanese language instruction for Japanese citizen children and other children in the area.

Media

The Tuscaloosa News is the major daily newspaper serving the city. The Tuscaloosa News also publishes several websites and Tuscaloosa Magazine. The primary news website is tuscaloosanews.com. Tidesports.com focuses on University of Alabama sports. The Tuscaloosa News' offices are located west of downtown on a bluff overlooking the Black Warrior River.

The Planet Weekly is the largest of the several alternative weekly newspapers published in the area. Additionally, each of the three colleges in the area are served by student-published periodicals, the largest being The Crimson White, the independent, student-run newspaper of the University of Alabama and one of several UA-affiliated student publications.

Kids Life Magazine is a free publication which focuses on family friendly events in the Tuscaloosa area.

Tuscaloosa is part of the Birmingham-Tuscaloosa-Anniston television market, which is the 40th largest in the nation.  All major networks have a presence in the market. WCFT 33 is the ABC affiliate, WIAT 42 is the CBS affiliate, WBRC 6 is the Fox affiliate, WVTM 13 is the NBC affiliate, WBIQ 10 is the PBS affiliate, WTTO 21 is the CW affiliate, WABM 68 is the MyNetworkTV affiliate and WVUA-CD 7 is the This TV affiliate. WVUA-CD is the only station that originates its broadcast in Tuscaloosa; it is owned by the University of Alabama and its studios are part of UA's Digital Media Center.

Tuscaloosa is the 234th largest radio market in the nation. In January 2007, of the top-ten-rated radio stations, two were urban, three were country, two were contemporary, and one each was gospel, oldies, and talk radio.

Tuscaloosa serves as home base to Alabama Public Radio, the state's largest public-radio network. APR's main studios are housed at the University of Alabama, and the flagship signal, WUAL-FM, originates from a transmitter south of town. WUAL serves Tuscaloosa, portions of the Birmingham metro area and several counties of west-central Alabama. The University of Alabama also houses WVUA-FM, a 24/7 college radio station run completely by students. Clear Channel Communications and Townsquare Media both own and operate a cluster of radio stations in Tuscaloosa, that form the majority of the market.

NOAA Weather Radio station KIH60 broadcasts weather and hazard information for Tuscaloosa and the surrounding vicinity.

Infrastructure

Health and medicine
DCH Regional Medical Center is the main medical facility in Tuscaloosa. Operated by the publicly controlled DCH Healthcare Authority, the 610-bed hospital opened in 1916 as the Druid City Infirmary. The emergency department at DCH operates a trauma center (though it is not verified as one by the American College of Surgeons, however) that serves all of west central Alabama and is one of the busiest in the state.  The DCH Healthcare authority also operates Northport Medical Center in neighboring Northport.

Other major medical centers in Tuscaloosa include the 702-bed Veterans Affairs Medical Center-Tuscaloosa, the 422-bed Bryce Hospital, Mary S. Harper Geriatric Psychiatry Center, and Taylor Hardin Secure Medical Facility.

Transportation

Tuscaloosa is connected to other parts of the country via air, rail, road and sea. The city lies at the intersection of several highways, including three federal highways (US 11, US 43, and US 82), three Alabama state highways (SR 69, SR 215, and SR 216) and two duplexed (conjoined) Interstates (I-20/I-59). Interstate 359 spurs off from I-20/I-59 and heads northward, ending in downtown Tuscaloosa. SR 297 will be the future loop road around Tuscaloosa.

Tuscaloosa also contains one toll road on the Black Warrior Parkway (I-20/I-59), charging $1.25 for automobiles, and one toll bridge (Black Warrior Parkway bridge).

Rail
Amtrak provides passenger rail service to Tuscaloosa though the Crescent line, which connects the area to major cities along the east coast from New York to New Orleans. Tuscaloosa station is situated at 2105 Greensboro Avenue, one mile (1.6 km) south of downtown. Norfolk Southern Railway and Alabama Southern Railroad provide freight services to the area. KCS previously provided service to the area before leasing its lines to Watco in July 2005.

Bus
Greyhound Bus Lines provides passenger bus service to Tuscaloosa. The Tuscaloosa Transit Authority operates the Tuscaloosa Trolley System. The Tuscaloosa Trolley provides local public bus transportation with four fixed routes that operate Monday through Friday from 5:00 am to 6:00 pm. The trolley's paint job is an illusion; it is an El Dorado Transmark RE bus, painted to look like a trolley.

Airport
The Tuscaloosa Regional Airport, on the north side of the Black Warrior River west of downtown Northport, is equipped with two lighted runways (6499' and 4001') and provides full facilities for the general aviation which the airport mainly serves.

Heliports include the Bryant Culberson Heliport and the Tuscaloosa Police Department Heliport.

Major highways
Tuscaloosa is served by many major highways, including I-20, I-59, and U.S. Route 82. I-20/59 run west to east through the southern part of the city, leading northeast 58 mi (93 km) to Birmingham and southwest 96 mi (154 km) to Meridian, MS. US 82 runs northwest to southeast through the city, locally known as McFarland Boulevard, and leads southeast 103 mi (166 km) to Montgomery and northwest 59 mi (95 km) to Columbus, MS. Many other state and local highways run through the city as well, in addition to a tolled bypass on the western side of the city connecting those coming from the west on US 82 to I-20/59 without going through the main part of the city.

Port of Tuscaloosa
The Port of Tuscaloosa is a river port located in the City of Tuscaloosa and administered by the Alabama State Port Authority.

The Black Warrior River is bounded along nearly its entire course by a series of locks and dams. They form a chain of narrow reservoirs, providing aids to navigation and barge handling as well as hydroelectric power and drinking water. The Black Warrior River watershed is a vital river basin entirely contained within Alabama, America's leading state for freshwater biodiversity. Near Tuscaloosa, the river flows out of the rocky Cumberland Plateau and enters the sandy East Gulf Coastal Plain. Barge transportation in and out of the Port of Tuscaloosa and other commercial navigation make the Black Warrior a silent giant in the state of Alabama's economy.
Though the Port of Tuscaloosa is a small one, it is one of the larger facilities on the Black Warrior River at waterway mile marker 338.5. There are no railway connections at this port as they primarily concentrate on the shipment of dry bulk commodities, including lignite, coal and coal coke. The federal government and the City of Tuscaloosa share the ownership of the Port of Tuscaloosa; the operation of the port is leased out to Powell Sales and has been run by them since 1997.

At waterway mile marker 343.2 on the opposite side of the river is a steel company with its own tracks at the rear of the plant connecting with the Kansas City Southern Railroad for barge shipments of iron and steel products such as ingots, bars, rods, steel slabs, plates and coils. Tuscaloosa Steel Corporation was one of the first U.S. steel companies to implement the Steckel Mill Technology.

The Port of Tuscaloosa grew out of the system of locks and dams on the Black Warrior River built by the U.S. Army Corps of Engineers in the 1890s. Its construction opened up an inexpensive transportation link to the Gulf seaport of Mobile, Alabama that stimulated the mining and metallurgical industries of the region that are still in operation.

The Army Corps of Engineers has maintained a system of locks and dams along the Black Warrior River for over a century to allow navigability all the way up to Birmingham. Barge traffic thus routinely runs through Tuscaloosa to the Alabama State Docks at Mobile, on the coast of the Gulf of Mexico. Via the Tenn-Tom Waterway, the city is connected to the Ohio River valley and beyond.

Notable people

(B) denotes that the person was born there.

Arts and entertainment
Paco Ahlgren, writer
Hannah Brown, Miss Alabama USA 2018, Bachelor season 23 (2018), Bachelorette season 15 (2019)
Rick Bragg, Pulitzer Prize-winning author and former reporter for The New York Times; lives in Tuscaloosa
Willie D. Burton, born in Tuscaloosa, sound technician in film industry; Oscar winner for Dreamgirls and Bird
Frank Calloway, folk artist
Thad Carhart, author of The Piano Shop on the Left Bank
Tom Cherones, from Tuscaloosa, University of Alabama alumnus, television producer and director of Seinfeld, NewsRadio, Desperate Housewives
Chase Coleman, actor, director, and musician best known for portraying Billy Winslow in HBO series Boardwalk Empire; born in Tuscaloosa
Mary Dees, grew up in Tuscaloosa, film actress during the 1930s, including The Last Gangster and The Women, stand-in for Jean Harlow in Saratoga, appeared in Three Stooges shorts, Marx Brothers comedies and on Broadway
Robert Gibson, one-half of professional wrestling team The Rock 'n' Roll Express
Frances Nimmo Greene, educator and author; born in Tuscaloosa
Vera Hall, born near Livingston, Alabama, lived in and married a man from Tuscaloosa; folk musician
Charlie Hayward, bass guitarist of Charlie Daniels Band
Watt Key, producer and author of books such as Alabama Moon; born in Tuscaloosa
Chuck Leavell, born in Birmingham but raised in Tuscaloosa; keyboardist for The Rolling Stones
William March, writer of psychological fiction, including The Bad Seed; highly decorated US Marine; buried in Evergreen Cemetery in Tuscaloosa
Debra Marshall, professional wrestler and diva with World Wrestling Entertainment
Madeline Mitchell, current Miss Tuscaloosa and Miss Alabama 2011, 2nd runner-up at the Miss USA pageant
Tim Samaras, engineer and storm chaser best known for his field research on tornadoes and for starring in Storm Chasers
Brandon Scott, actor best known for his roles in Grey's Anatomy Wreck-It Ralph, and The Last of Us
Johnny Shines, musician and member of the Blues Hall of Fame
Dylan Riley Snyder, born in Tuscaloosa; actor, star of Broadway's Tarzan, film Life During Wartime and TV sitcom Kickin' It
Reed Timmer, meteorologist and storm chaser known for starring in Storm Chasers and Tornado Glory
Dinah Washington, born in Tuscaloosa, blues, R&B and jazz singer, member of Rock and Roll Hall of Fame
Kellie Wells, University of Alabama professor and short story writer

Politics
Robert J. Bentley, dermatologist elected Governor of Alabama in 2010
Abdurrahim El-Keib, interim prime minister of Libya (2011–2012); lived in Tuscaloosa while a professor at University of Alabama
Walter Flowers, reared in Tuscaloosa, United States Congressman, served on committee that voted for impeachment of President Richard Nixon
Lewis McAllister, Tuscaloosa businessman and first Republican to serve in Mississippi House of Representatives since Reconstruction, 1962-1968
Robert Morrow, chairman of Republican Party of Travis County, Texas, considered a conspiracy theorist, born in Tuscaloosa c. 1964
Condoleezza Rice, lived in Tuscaloosa as a child while her father taught at Stillman College
Richard C. Shelby, U.S. Senator, Chairman of the United States Senate Committee on Banking, Housing, and Urban Affairs and Chairman of the United States Senate Appropriations Subcommittee on Commerce, Justice, Science, and Related Agencies
Margaret Tutwiler, former resident of Tuscaloosa, served in three presidential administrations, former Ambassador to Kingdom of Morocco, Under Secretary for Public Diplomacy and Public Affairs in State Department
Lurleen Wallace, born in Tuscaloosa, former Governor of Alabama
Coleman Young, born in Tuscaloosa, served as Mayor of Detroit from 1974 to 1993

Sports
Tim Anderson, born in Tuscaloosa, Major League Baseball player for Chicago White Sox
Javier Arenas, lives in Tuscaloosa, NFL cornerback and return specialist for Atlanta Falcons; cousin of Gilbert Arenas
Ollie Brown, born in Tuscaloosa, Major League Baseball player
Bear Bryant, lived and died in Tuscaloosa, iconic Alabama coach in College Football Hall of Fame
Keydren "Kee-Kee" Clark, born in Tuscaloosa, basketball player who averaged 25.9 points per game during NCAA career at Saint Peter's
Sylvester Croom, born in Tuscaloosa, first African-American head football coach in Southeastern Conference
Bennie Daniels, Major League Baseball player
Otis Davis (born 1932), Olympic track and field athlete, gold medals in 400 metre dash and 4 × 400 metres relay at 1960 Summer Olympics, setting a world record in the former event(B)
 Joe Dawson, born in Tuscaloosa, American-Israeli basketball player, 1992 Israeli Basketball Premier League MVP
George Foster, born in Tuscaloosa, Major League Baseball player
Butch Hobson, born in Tuscaloosa, Major League Baseball player and manager
Rusty Jackson, born in Tuscaloosa, punter who played for NFL's Los Angeles Rams and Buffalo Bills
Kirani James, lives in Tuscaloosa and won gold at London 2012 Summer Olympics in the 400m
Patton Kizzire, pro golfer, raised in Tuscaloosa, attended Tuscaloosa High School and Northridge High School
Frank Lary, attended University of Alabama, pitcher and 3-time All-Star in Major League Baseball
Angel Martino, born in Tuscaloosa, Olympic swimmer
Lee Maye, born in Tuscaloosa, Major League baseball player
Nate Miller, born in Tuscaloosa, pro football player
Billy Neighbors, born in Tuscaloosa, football guard for University of Alabama and NFL's Washington Redskins and Boston Patriots; inducted in College Football Hall of Fame 2003
Willie Nixon, lived in Tuscaloosa for unspecified period prior to career, Negro League baseball player
Andy Phillips, born in Tuscaloosa, former major league baseball player and Alabama baseball assistant coach
Dicky Pride, born in Tuscaloosa, PGA Tour golfer
Chase Purdy, born in Tuscaloosa, NASCAR driver
Tike Redman, born in Tuscaloosa, MLB player for Pittsburgh Pirates, New York Mets, and Baltimore Orioles
David Robertson, raised in Tuscaloosa, attended Central and Bryant High School and University of Alabama, pitcher for New York Yankees
Mason Rudolph, died in Tuscaloosa, PGA Tour golfer
Joe Sewell, attended University of Alabama, MLB player in Baseball Hall of Fame
John Stallworth, born in Tuscaloosa, played football for Pittsburgh Steelers, played in six AFC championships and went to four Super Bowls
Frank Thomas, lived and died in Tuscaloosa, University of Alabama head football coach
D. J. White, born in Tuscaloosa, basketball player for NBA's Charlotte Bobcats
Deontay Wilder, born in Tuscaloosa, boxer, 2008 Olympic bronze medalist and Former WBC World Heavyweight Champion

Other
Frank Duarte, laser physicist, taught at University of Alabama
Sylvia Hitchcock, Miss Alabama USA 1967, Miss USA 1967 and Miss Universe 1967
Robert Shelton, Imperial Wizard of United Klans of America
Shannon Shorr, professional poker player
James Spann, meteorologist
Mary Tillotson, CNN journalist
Michael Tuomey, first Alabama state geologist
Robert J. Van de Graaff, designer of the Van de Graaff generator
Taylor Demonbreun, World Record holder
Jimmy Wales, Internet entrepreneur and a co-founder and promoter of Wikipedia

Sister cities
The Tuscaloosa Sister Cities Commission was formed in 1986. The city currently has sister city relationships with cities in three countries:
 Narashino, Chiba, Japan
 Schorndorf, Baden-Württemberg, Germany
 Sunyani–Techiman, Ghana (Two cities partnered as one sister city)

Gallery

See also

National Register of Historic Places listings in Tuscaloosa County, Alabama
Properties on the Alabama Register of Landmarks and Heritage in Tuscaloosa County, Alabama
West End Christian School hostage crisis (1988)
USS Tuscaloosa, 2 ships

References

Bibliography

External links

 Official City Homepage
 Chamber of Commerce of West Alabama

1819 establishments in Alabama
Cities in Alabama
Cities in Tuscaloosa County, Alabama
County seats in Alabama
Alabama
People from Tuscaloosa, Alabama
Populated places established in 1819
 
Tuscaloosa, Alabama metropolitan area
University of Alabama
Alabama placenames of Native American origin